Shift is the seventh studio album by Australian punk rock band The Living End, released in May 2016.  It was produced by Paul Annison and recorded at Red Door Sounds in Melbourne, Australia.

Track listing
All tracks are written by Chris Cheney, except where noted.

Personnel

The Living End
 Chris Cheney – vocals, guitar
 Scott Owen – double bass, backing vocals
 Andy Strachan – drums, backing vocals

Additional musicians
Anton Patzner and Lewis Patzner - strings on 'Keep On Running'

Production
 Paul 'Woody' Annison - production,  mixing 
 Chris Cheney – production
 Will Bowden - mastering
 Daniel Caswell - engineer

Artwork
 Next Episode - art direction, layout
 Kane Hibberd - photography

Tour

Charts

References

2016 albums
The Living End albums
Dew Process albums